Vaniprevir (MK-7009) is a macrocyclic hepatitis C virus (HCV) NS3/4A protease inhibitor, developed by Merck & Co., which is currently in clinical testing.In Japan, it was approved for treating hepatitis C in 2014 under the brand name Vanihep.

References

Experimental drugs
Cyclopropyl compounds
Macrocycles
Pyrrolidines
NS3/4A protease inhibitors
Tert-butyl compounds